Fredrik Amadeus Wulff (February 11, 1845 in Gothenburg – December 31, 1930 in Lund) was a Swedish phonetician and philologist.

References 
  Lindblad, Göran. 1925. Svensk biografisk handbok, p. 832

Phoneticians
Swedish philologists
1845 births
1930 deaths